Simon Tavaré  (born 1952) is the founding Director of the Herbert and Florence Irving Institute of Cancer Dynamics at Columbia University. Prior to joining Columbia, he was Director of the Cancer Research UK Cambridge Institute, Professor of Cancer Research at the Department of Oncology and Professor in the Department of Applied Mathematics and Theoretical Physics (DAMTP) at the University of Cambridge.

Education
Tavaré was educated at Oundle School and the University of Sheffield where he was awarded a Bachelor of Science degree in 1974, a Master of Science degree in 1975, and a PhD in 1979.

Research and career
Tavaré is a computational biologist and statistician, with his research focusing on three main areas: statistical methods for the analysis of next‑generation sequencing data, evolutionary approaches to cancer and methods for the analysis of genomics data.

Tavaré's research has been funded by Cancer Research UK, the Royal Society, the European Union, Horizon 2020, the Wellcome Trust, the Biotechnology and Biological Sciences Research Council (BBSRC), the Engineering and Physical Sciences Research Council (EPSRC), the Medical Research Council (MRC) and the National Institutes of Health (NIH).

Awards and honours
Tavare was elected a Fellow of the Royal Society (FRS) in 2011 and a Fellow of the Academy of Medical Sciences (FMedSci) in 2009. He held a Royal Society Wolfson Research Merit Award from 2003 to 2009. In 2018, Tavare was elected a Fellow of the American Mathematical Society and a Foreign Associate of the National Academy of Sciences.  In 2020 he was elected an Honorary Fellow of Christ's College, Cambridge, the College of which he had been a Fellow while a professor at Cambridge between 2004 and 2019.

References

1952 births
Alumni of the University of Sheffield
Fellows of the Royal Society
Fellows of Christ's College, Cambridge
Fellows of the American Mathematical Society
Fellows of the American Statistical Association
Foreign associates of the National Academy of Sciences
Cancer researchers
British bioinformaticians
Living people
People educated at Oundle School
Department of Oncology, University of Cambridge